Heliothis proruptus is a species of moth of the family Noctuidae. It is found in North America, including California and Oregon.

The wingspan is about 27 mm.

External links
 Images

Heliothis
Moths described in 1873